Simpson Design is an American automobile coachbuilder founded in 1978 by owner Jim Simpson. The company is based in Clinton, Whidbey Island, located just outside of Seattle, Washington, and specializes in the production of custom sports cars coachbuilt bodies and interiors, mainly built on the Mazda Miata MX-5 chassis.

History
In 1978, Company founded by current CEO Jim Simpson in Houston, TX

In 1991, Blue Ray 1 created for SEMA

In 1992, Blue Ray 3 show car created for Nardi introduction at Pebble Beach Concours, debuted at Concours Italiano

In 2002, Simpson Design relocated headquarters to Clinton, WA

Models

Production Models 

 Swift
 Italia 3 GTZ
 Italia 3 SWB
 Italia 2
 Italia Classic

Show Cars 

 Manta Ray
 Blue Ray 3 (1992 Pebble Beach Concours d'Elegance / Concours Italiano show car)
 Blue Ray 2
 Blue Ray 1 (1991 SEMA show car)

References

External links
 Official web site
 Official Facebook site

Coachbuilders of the United States
Sports car manufacturers
Car brands
Companies based in Seattle
Manufacturing companies based in Washington (state)